The 2021 Major League Soccer All-Star Game was the 25th edition of the annual Major League Soccer All-Star Game, an exhibition soccer match in the United States. The game, featuring the MLS All-Stars taking on the Liga MX All-Stars, was played at Banc of California Stadium in Los Angeles, California.

The game was originally scheduled to take place on July 29, 2020, during the 2020 season, but was postponed on May 19, 2020, due to the COVID-19 pandemic. The game was televised domestically on Fox Sports 1 and Univision in the United States, and on TSN and TVA Sports in Canada.

The MLS All-Stars won the match 3–2 on penalties after the 90 minute-match ended in a 1–1 tie.

Match planning

The Major League Soccer All-Star Game originally fielded two all-star teams from the Western and Eastern conferences. Other competition formats pitted an all-star team against various opponents, including the United States men's national soccer team and clubs from Mexico and Europe. An exhibition between the MLS All-Stars and an all-star team from Liga MX, the top flight of Mexican soccer, was proposed in the mid-2010s as part of a closer relationship between the leagues. Officials from MLS and Liga MX announced a new partnership in March 2018, including new club competitions like the Campeones Cup and Leagues Cup, and a commitment for a shared all-star game. Liga MX president Enrique Bonilla attended the 2018 MLS All-Star Game in Atlanta with MLS commissioner Don Garber, where they continued discussions for the match, including a potential venue in the Los Angeles area.

On November 20, 2019, MLS officially announced that the 2020 All-Star Game would be played against the Liga MX All-Stars at Banc of California Stadium, the home of Los Angeles FC. It is the first to be played against an all-star team from another league. LAFC head coach Bob Bradley was selected as the manager of the MLS All-Star team. It is the first MLS All-Star Game to be played in the Los Angeles area since 2003, which was hosted by the LA Galaxy at the Home Depot Center, now known as Dignity Health Sports Park.

On May 19, 2020, MLS announced that the All-Star Game would be canceled alongside the 2020 Leagues Cup and 2020 Campeones Cup due to the COVID-19 pandemic. The league later announced that the All-Star Game would be rescheduled for the 2021 season in Los Angeles, with the MLS All-Stars against the Liga MX All-Stars. The league announced on June 9, 2021, that the All-Star Game against Liga MX would be played on August 25 at Banc of California Stadium.

Squads

MLS All-Stars
The MLS All-Star squad was announced on August 4, 2021. Carlos Vela and Javier Hernández withdrew due to injury. New England players Carles Gil and Tajon Buchanan withdrew as well as Minnesota United midfielder Emanuel Reynoso. Rodolfo Pizarro, George Bello, and Sebastian Lletget were added as replacements.

Six members of the starting XI were selected from Seattle Sounders FC, tying the record set by D.C. United in 2006. Brothers Cristian Roldan and Alex Roldan also became the first brothers to play for the All-Star team.

 Manager:  Bob Bradley (Los Angeles FC)

Liga MX All-Stars
The Liga MX All-Star squad was announced on July 19, 2021. Nahuel Guzmán and Jorge Sánchez were called up as replacements for José de Jesús Corona and Fernando Navarro who withdrew due to injury. On August 23, the final squad was announced with 10 new players added.

 Manager:  Juan Reynoso (Cruz Azul)

Skills Challenge

The MLS All-Star Skills Challenge was played on August 24 at Banc of California Park between eight players from each team in five events. The Liga MX All-Stars defeated the MLS All-Stars in the competition by a score of 26–25, with the tiebreaker scored by Cruz Azul forward Jonathan Rodríguez in the Crossbar Challenge.

Broadcasting

The All-Star Game and Skills Challenge were both broadcast in the United States on Fox Sports 1 in English and TUDN in Spanish, as well as TSN and TVA Sports in Canada. Fox Sports broadcast the match in 4K HDR and also deployed several special slow-motion cameras for the match, as well as a skycam. The Fox Sports broadcast averaged 175,000 viewers, setting a record low for the event's English broadcasts, while the TUDN broadcast averaged 1.4 million and peaked at 1.6 million—the second-most for a Spanish broadcast of the match.

Match

Match rules

Unlimited substitutions
Penalty shoot-out if tied at full time; no extra time

References

2021
All-Star Game
August 2021 sports events in the United States
2021 in sports in California
2021–22 Liga MX season
2021–22 in Mexican football
Association football penalty shoot-outs